Akash Ar Mati (The Sky and the Earth) is a 1959 black and white film directed by Fateh Lohani and produced by Film Development Corporation (FDC). It was the first sound feature produced in East Pakistan (now Bangladesh) including post-production, though like Mukh O Mukhosh (The Face and the Mask), the first Bengali-language film made in East Pakistan, it used some cast and crew from the West Bengal film industry.

Background
Akash Ar Mati was actor-director Fateh Lohani's second venture. Satrang, an Urdu film directed by him was released in 1965. 
He based Akash ar Mati on one of dramatist Bidhayak Bhattacharya's stories. A musical film, it was thematically ambitious. But it suffered from poor technical knowledge and the inexperience of film-makers of Dhaka. The film flopped commercially.

Legendary Bangladeshi actress Sumita Devi, Fazlul Karirt, Pradip, the first Bangladeshi hero Aminul Haque, Dagu, Ali, Zinat, Rablul, Madhuri, Tejon, and Ranon acted in the film. Baby Islam was the cinematographer. Subal Das was the music director.

Cast
 Sumita Devi	
 Fazlul Karirt
 Madhuri
 Aminul Haque
 Rabiul Alam

See also
 Cinema of Bangladesh

References

External links
 

1959 films
1959 musical films
Bengali-language Pakistani films
Bangladeshi musical films
1950s Bengali-language films
Films scored by Subal Das